WHTG (1410 AM) is a radio station broadcasting an oldies format. Licensed to Eatontown, New Jersey, United States, the station serves the Monmouth County and Ocean County area.  The station is currently owned by Press Communications, LLC and features programming from AP Radio.

The station also broadcasts on simulcast translator W264DH on 100.7 FM in Eatontown, New Jersey.

History
WHTG AM Sign-on the air on November 1, 1957.

The station simulcast the programming offerings of its co-owned station WHTG-FM until 1984, when the AM station began playing a big-band standards format while the FM station began featuring alternative rock. Eventually the station gravitated toward an oldies format, called "Great Gold", which it retains today.

Until its purchase in 2000 by Press Communications, the station was privately owned by the Gade family, the station's founders. While the station maintains its original AM tower and transmitter site in Tinton Falls, the studios are now located in nearby Neptune.

During the sixties, Wally Dow announced, sold time, and performed all general duties at the station. He was general manager of the station from 1968 until September 1970, when he and his family moved to Florida.

For much of its history WHTG was a daytime only radio station. The station's traditional signoff was Perry Como's recording of "The Lord's Prayer", used every day except for Yom Kippur when a different signoff was used. Relaxing of FCC rules allowed the station to broadcast for two hours after local sunset and now broadcasts around the clock on 500 watts daytime and 126 watts nighttime. Once the station changes over to 126 watts the listening radius is severely diminished.

On July 28, 2022, WHTG changed its branding to "The Breeze", now positioning as "The Jersey Shore's Feel Good Station". "The Breeze" was previously used on Press stations WBHX 99.7 Tuckerton and WWZY 107.1 Long Branch until 2013.

Translators

References

External links

HTG
Eatontown, New Jersey
Oldies radio stations in the United States